The 2010 Winter Olympics, officially known as the XXI Olympic Winter Games, was a    winter multi-sport event held in Vancouver, British Columbia, Canada, from February 12 to February 28. A total of 2,632 athletes (+124 from 2006 Olympics) representing 82 National Olympic Committees (NOCs) (+2 from 2006) participated in 86 events (+2 from 2006) from 15 different sports and disciplines (unchanged from 2006).

Athletes from 26 NOCs won at least one medal, and athletes from 19 of these NOCs secured at least one gold. For the first time, Canada won a gold medal at an Olympic Games it hosted, having failed to do so at both the 1976 Summer Olympics in Montreal and the 1988 Winter Olympics in Calgary. In contrast to the lack of gold medals at these previous Olympics, the Canadian team finished first overall in gold medal wins, and became the first host nation—since Norway in 1952—to lead the gold medal count, with 14 medals. In doing so, it also broke the record for the most gold medals won by a NOC at a single Winter Olympics (the previous was 13, set by the Soviet Union in 1976 and matched by Norway in 2002).  The United States placed first in total medals—its second time doing so in a Winter Games—and set a new record for most medals won by a NOC at a single Winter Olympics, with 37 (the previous record was 36, established by Germany in 2002).  Athletes from Slovakia and Belarus won the first Winter Olympic gold medals for their nations.

Cross-country skier Marit Bjørgen from Norway won five medals (three gold, one silver, one bronze), more than any other athlete. Chinese short track speed skater Wang Meng tied Bjørgen for the lead in gold medals, with three.


Medal table

The medal table is based on information provided by the International Olympic Committee (IOC) and is consistent with IOC convention in its published medal tables. By default, the table is ordered by the number of gold medals the athletes from a nation have won, where a nation is an entity represented by a National Olympic Committee (NOC). The number of silver medals is taken into consideration next and then the number of bronze medals. If nations are still tied, equal ranking is given and they are listed alphabetically.

In the men's individual biathlon competition, two silver medals were awarded for a second-place tie, so no bronze medal was awarded for that event.

See also
 2010 Winter Paralympics medal table

References

External links
 
 
 
 

Medal table
Winter Olympics medal tables